Margaret Anne Jackson   (born 17 March 1953) is an Australian corporate executive.

Early life and education 
Jackson was born in Warragul, Victoria, and studied at Warragul High School. She graduated with a Bachelor of Economics degree from Monash University and a MBA from the University of Melbourne.

Career 

Jackson was the chairman of Qantas from 2000 to 2007 and was the first woman to become chairman of a top-50 publicly listed company in Australia. She had been a director of Qantas since 1992, her other directorships include the ANZ since 1994 and Billabong.

Jackson is a former partner of accounting firm KPMG and has worked for accounting firms BDO Nelson Parkhill and Pricewaterhouse (now PricewaterhouseCoopers).

She is a chartered accountant and a fellow of the Institute of Chartered Accountants in Australia.

Qantas takeover bid
In early May 2007, Jackson faced mounting pressure to resign from the board of Qantas after the dramatic last-minute failure of the Qantas takeover bid by Airline Partners Australia. After the bid failed, she faced criticism that she had undervalued the airline, was reluctant to release upgraded profit forecasts and did not act in the best interests of the majority of shareholders.
Jackson was one of the most outspoken supporters of the takeover bid and, when asked of the ramifications of the bid failing, she famously stated, "If anyone thinks this will happen without affecting the (share) price then they have a mental problem with how the market works." This was interpreted by some observers as an insult to shareholders and evidence that Jackson was actively lobbying for the takeover consortium.

On 17 May 2007, Jackson informed the Qantas board that she would "retire from the board when her term ends at this year's AGM", due to be held in November of that year. The board put its support behind Jackson's decision to stay on until then because it ensured "continuity and stability" was maintained in the company.

John Howard, then the Australian prime minister, described Jackson's retirement decision as "a matter for her" and made no direct comment, but expressed his support and confidence in her. Following the collapse of the Qantas sale bid, number of highly respected businesspeople and personalities spoke out in support of Jackson including Sir Rod Eddington (Former Chief Executive Officer of British Airways) and former Victorian Premier Jeff Kennett.

As Qantas's business performance has deteriorated, and with it the company's stock price, opinions on Jackson and her support of the sale bid have shifted. By May 2008, the share price had fallen by over 40 per cent since the takeover period with the bid price sitting at a 33-per-cent premium. Many media commentators such as Jennifer Hewett have suggested Jackson had been correct in her assertions that the takeover offer was a good deal for shareholders. The increasing difficulties surrounding Qantas seen in 2013 and 2014 led to further public comments by commentators in support of Jackson's actions and comments surrounding the proposed Qantas sale - "Meanwhile, former Qantas chair Margaret Jackson will no doubt muse on that $5.40 a share offer which was rejected just before the GFC. She was right, anyone who didn't accept was mad."

Honours and awards
 Fellow of the Institute of Chartered Accountants in Australia (FCA)
 Companion of the Order of Australia (AC), 9 June 2003 For service to business in diverse and leading Australian corporations and to the community in the area of support for medical research, the arts and education

References

External links
Margaret Jackson bio - Qantas Board of Directors
Monash University, Prominent alumni
Margaret Jackson Lecture at Australian National University

1953 births
Living people
Companions of the Order of Australia
Businesspeople in aviation
Australian corporate directors
Qantas people
Australian accountants
University of Melbourne alumni
Monash University alumni
Women corporate directors
People from Warragul